Jerzy Fitelberg (May 20, 1903 – April 25, 1951) was a Polish-American composer.

Biography 
Son of Grzegorz Fitelberg, Jerzy was born in Warsaw. He first studied music with his father. At a young age, his father had him play percussion in the orchestra of the National Theatre, Warsaw to gain experience. He subsequently studied in Moscow.

From 1922–1926 he studied composition with Walter Gmeindl and Franz Schreker at the Berlin University of the Arts. In 1923 the University helped him get a deferment for the Polish military draft .

In 1927 he re-orchestrated Arthur Sullivan's music for "The Mikado" for Erik Charell's re-staging as an operetta-revue in Berlin's Grosses Schauspielhaus. (Review in the Times (London) September 2, 1927)

In 1928, his String Quartet no. 2 won first prize in a competition organized by the Association of Young Polish Musicians in Paris.

His first violin concerto made a major impression on the 1929 International Society for Contemporary Music concert. Music critic Henry Prunieres remarked "The violin concerto...[was] delicate, sensitive with a fine feeling for orchestral resource." His works were heard at subsequent ISCM concerts of 1931, 1937, 1946 and 1951.

Escaping the Nazis, he first traveled to Paris in 1933. There his music was published by Editions Max Eschig. His String Quartet no. 4 won the Elizabeth Sprague Coolidge Award administered by the Library of Congress. The work had its premiere on April 9, 1937 at the Library of Congress.

He then emigrated to New York City, arriving on May 15, 1940.  Among the first works he composed in his new city were those reminiscent of Poland. In 1945, his fifth string quartet was awarded with a prize from the American Academy of Arts and Letters.

His application for US Citizenship was filed on May 26, 1947. At the time he was living at 244 West 72nd Street in New York City.

He died in New York in 1951.

Style 
Fitelberg said that his style of composition was similar to "the energy and high voltage music of Stravinsky, a focus on linear and harmonic complexity as in Hindemith, and colors of contemporary French music (such as Milhaud), as well as styles of satire.

Legacy 
Jerzy Fitelberg's manuscripts are housed in the Music Division of The New York Public Library for the Performing Arts.

List of works

Operas 
Henny Penny

Orchestral works 
 Suite No. 1 (1925)
 Suite No. 2 (1928)
 Concerto for Strings (1930) - transcription of the "String Quartet No. 2" (1928)
 Concert Piece (1937)
 The Golden Horn (1942)
 Epitaph (1943)
 Nocturne (1944)
 Polish Pictures, suite (1946)
 Symphony for Strings (1946)
 Sinfonietta (1946)
 Concert Overture (wind orchestra)
 Der schlechtgefesselte Prometheus, (suite from a ballet)
 Symphony No. 1 (?)
 Symphony No. 2 (?)

Concertante works 
 Violin Concerto No. 1 (1928 ; rev. 1947)
 Piano Concerto No. 1 (1929)
 Cello Concerto (1931)
 Piano Concerto No. 2 (1934 ; rev. 1950)
 Violin Concerto No. 2 (1938)
 Concerto for Trombone, Piano and Strings (1947)
 Clarinet Concerto (1948)

Choral works 
Three Polish Folksongs

Chamber music 
 Quintetto (flute, oboe, clarinet, bass clarinet, trombone) (1929)
 Sonatine for 2 violins (1935)
 Sonata, 2 violins, 2 pianos (1938)
 String Quartet No. 1 (1926)
 String Quartet No. 2 (1928)
 String Quartet No. 3 (1936)
 String Quartet No. 4 (1936)
 String Quartet No. 5 (1945)
 Serenade (Viola, piano), 1943
 Serenade (violin, double bass)
 Seven Caprices for viola and piano (1944)
 Capriccio (flute, oboe, B♭ clarinet, bass clarinet, trombone or bassoon) (1948)
 Concerta da camera (violin, piano)
 Duo (violin, cello) (1948)
 Sonata (solo violoncello) (1948)
 Sonata No. 1 for piano (1933)
 Suite for organ (1949)
 3 Mazurkas (piano) (1932)
 What is Benjamin?: a musical tale for children to read and to play on the piano (1950)

Film music 
 Poland Fights On (1943)
 Pre-war Poland (1945)

As author 
 Fitelberg, Jerzy. "Aspects of instrumentation today." Modern Music vol. 9, no. 31 (Nov.-Dec. 1931), p. 28-30.
 Fitelberg, Jerzy. "News from overseas." Modern Music vol. 23, no. 1 (Winter 1946), p. 42-44.
 Fitelberg, Jerzy. "Forecast and review." Modern Music vol. 9, no. 4 (May – Jun. 1932), p. 184-87.

References 
Cadenbach, Rainer. "Jerzy Fitelberg" in Franz Schrekers Schüler in Berlin: biographische Beiträge und Dokumente. Schriften aus dem Archiv der Universität der Künste Berlin, Band 8. Berlin: Universität der Künste Berlin, 2005, p. 25-28.

External links 
Jerzy Fitelberg papers, 1921-1952 Music Division, New York Public Library for the Performing Arts.

Notes 

 

1903 births
1951 deaths
Polish composers
American male classical composers
American classical composers
American people of Polish-Jewish descent
Jewish American classical composers
20th-century classical composers
20th-century American composers
20th-century American male musicians
20th-century American Jews
Polish emigrants to the United States